Some Change is an album by the American musician Boz Scaggs, released in 1994.

Critical reception

Entertainment Weekly deemed the album "a competent snooze for closet New Age fans."

AllMusic's retrospective review called Some Change "a very honest and natural-sounding collection of pop, pop/rock, and soul-influenced pop" and "his best album since 1976's Silk Degrees."

Track listing
All songs are written by Boz Scaggs unless noted.
 "You Got My Letter" - 4:23
 "Some Change" - 6:11
 "I'll Be the One" - 5:29
 "Call Me" (Robben Ford, Michael Omartian, Scaggs) - 3:18
 "Fly Like a Bird" - 3:35
 "Sierra" - 5:21
 "Lost It" - 5:52
 "Time" - 4:18
 "Illusion" (Marcus Miller, Scaggs) - 5:28
 "Follow That Man" - 5:51

Personnel 
 Boz Scaggs – vocals, guitars, keyboards, bass (5)
 Michael Rodriguez – programming
 Ricky Fataar – keyboards, drums, accordion (5), organ (5)
 Austin de Lone – acoustic piano (1)
 Booker T. Jones – Hammond B3 organ (2)
 William "Smitty" Smith – organ solo (5)
 Barry Beckett – acoustic piano (7)
 Michael Omartian – synthesizers (7), organ solo (7)
 Kevin Bents – Rhodes (7, 9, 10)
 Fred Tackett – rhythm guitar (2), acoustic guitar (6)
 James "Hutch" Hutchinson – bass (2, 8)
 Nathan East – bass (6, 9, 10)
 Neil Stubenhaus – bass (7)

Production
 Producers – Boz Scaggs and Ricky Fataar
 Co-producer on Tracks 4 & 7 – Barry Beckett
 Engineers – Richard Dodd (Track 1), Dan Garcia and Paul McKenna (Tracks 2-10).
 Digital Editing and Additional Engineering – Michael Rodriguez
 Mixed by Richard Dodd
 Mix Assistant – Karl Derfler
 Mastered by Bernie Grundman
 Art Direction – Len Peltier
 Design – Tom Dolan
 Photography – Jean-Baptiste Mondino

References

External links
 Some Change Lyrics

1994 albums
Boz Scaggs albums
Albums produced by Ricky Fataar
Virgin Records albums
Albums produced by Boz Scaggs